Marinobacterium stanieri is a Gram-negative bacterium found in sea water. The name Pseudomonas stanieri is a synonym.

References
Satomi (M.), Kimura (B.), Hamada (T.), S. Harayama and T. Fujji: Phylogenetic study of the genus Oceanospirillum based on 16S rRNA and gyrB genes: emended description of the genus Oceanospirillum, description of Pseudospirillum gen. nov., Oceanobacter gen. nov. and Terasakiella gen. nov. and transfer of Oceanospirillum jannaschii and Pseudomonas stanieri to Marinobacterium as Marinobacterium jannaschii comb. nov. and Marinobacterium stanieri comb. no. Int. J. Syst. Evol. Microbiol., 2002, 52, 739-747
Online

External links
 Genus Marinobacterium stanieri at J.P. Euzéby: List of Prokaryotic names with Standing in Nomenclature
Type strain of Marinobacterium stanieri at BacDive -  the Bacterial Diversity Metadatabase

Alteromonadales
Bacteria described in 2002